Dalindyebo is a South African surname that may refer to

 Sabata Dalindyebo (1928–1986), South African royalty, descendant of Ngubengcuka
 Buyelekhaya Dalindyebo (born 1964), South African royalty, descendant of Ngubengcuka

Xhosa-language surnames